King George was built on the Thames in 1783 as a West Indiaman. From 1817 she made four voyages as a whaler in the British southern whale fishery. She was condemned at Guayaquil in 1824 on her fifth.

Career
King George first appeared in Lloyd's Register (LR) in 1783 with O'Brian, master, Neave & Co., owners, and trade London–Antigua.

1st whaling voyage (1817–1818): Captain Francis Todrig sailed from London on 9 May 1817. King George returned on 29 March 1818 with 490 casks of whale oil and 160 seal skins.

2nd whaling voyage (1818–1819): From this voyage Todrig & Co. owned King George. Captain Kemp sailed on 16 June 1818 for the South Seas.King George, Kemp, master, returned on 29 October 1819 with 250 casks of whale oil, fins, and two seal skins.

3rd whaling voyage (1820–1821): Captain Thomas Duell (or Dewell), sailed from London on 8 February 1820, bound for the coast of Africa. On 10 June she was in Mossel Bay. On 10 August 1820 she was at Saint Helena, having come from the coast of Africa. On 13 August she sailed  for the Brazil coast. On 10 April 1821 she sailed from Saint Helena for England. King George returned on 24 July 1821 with 650 casks of whale oil, the fins of three whales, and 1,550 seal skins.

4th whaling voyage (1821–1822): Captain Todrig sailed from Deal on 17 October 1821, bound for the South Seas. On 29 October she sailed from Torbay, still bound for the South Seas. On 31 March 1822 King George was at South Georgia with three tons of oil.

5th whaling voyage (1823–Loss): King George, Bryan, master, arrived at the Cape of Good Hope on 1 February 1823 from Tristan da Cunha. The "King George Whaler", Captain Charles Bryan, sailed on 25 April from the Cape. On 17 July the whaler King George, Captain Charles Bryant, from England, via the Cape, in ballast, put into Storm Bay Passage (Derwent River (Tasmania)), to join Thalia, for the whaling season. In late September King George, and her tender, the 28-ton (bm) sloop Success, Anderson, master, came into Hobart.

King George sailed again in November for New Zealand. On 19 October 1824 Lloyd's List reported that King George "Whaler, late Bryan", had been condemned at Guayaquil.

Notes

Citations

References
 

1783 ships
Age of Sail merchant ships of England
Whaling ships
Maritime incidents in 1824